The Suedama Ensemble is a chamber orchestra based in New York City.

It was founded in 2005 by the pianist and conductor David Greilsammer. The orchestra is made of young musicians from many different nationalities and backgrounds. Its repertoire goes from early baroque to contemporary music. The Suedama ensemble has made 2 recordings for the French label Naïve:

Discography 

 Mozart Early Piano Concertos, Naïve, 2006, David Greilsammer piano and conductor
 Mozart Piano Concertos nos. 22 and 24, Naïve, 2009, David Greilsammer piano and conductor

Awards 
 CD of the year, 2007, Daily Telegraph
 Supersonic Award, 2008, Pizzicato Magazine

References 

Chamber music groups